Álvaro Robredo Crespo (born 3 April 1993, in Ezcaray) is a Spanish former professional cyclist, who competed professionally for the  team between 2014 and 2019.

References

External links

1993 births
Living people
Spanish male cyclists
Cyclists from La Rioja (Spain)